Pseudophilautus pleurotaenia is a species of frog in the family Rhacophoridae.
It is endemic to Sri Lanka.

Its natural habitat is subtropical or tropical moist lowland forests.
It is threatened by habitat loss.

References

pleurotaenia
Frogs of Sri Lanka
Endemic fauna of Sri Lanka
Amphibians described in 1904
Taxonomy articles created by Polbot